The Candler County School District is a public school district in Candler County, Georgia, United States, based in Metter, Georgia. It serves the communities of Metter and Pulaski, Georgia.

Schools
The Candler County School District has two elementary schools, one middle school, and one high school.

Elementary schools 
Metter Elementary School
Metter Intermediate School

Middle school
Metter Middle School

High school
Metter High School

References

External links

School districts in Georgia (U.S. state)
Education in Candler County, Georgia